Ardatovsky District is the name of several administrative and municipal districts in Russia.
Ardatovsky District, Republic of Mordovia, an administrative and municipal district of the Republic of Mordovia
Ardatovsky District, Nizhny Novgorod Oblast, an administrative and municipal district of Nizhny Novgorod Oblast

References